E. coli nitroreductase is a flavoprotein found in the bacteria Escherichia coli. It catalyses the reduction of nitro groups in a wide range of substrates to produce the corresponding hydroxylamine. Although its role in vivo is unclear, it has been identified as useful in the metabolism of a number of prodrugs in anti-cancer gene therapy.

See also
 Reduction of nitro compounds

References

Bacterial enzymes